Amanda Strang also known as Amanda S is a French actress, singer, presenter and former fashion model based in Hong Kong. She appeared in 2001 movie Martial Angels and was a presenter on the food related television show Market Trotter. In 2011 she opened her own French pâtisserie petiteAmanda in Hong Kong.

Biography 
Strang was born in 1980 in Tahiti, French Polynesia to a French father and a Taiwanese mother. Being raised in Hong Kong, she moved with her family to India at age nine before starting to model and subsequently entering the film industry. Over the course of eight years she appeared in five different films and became a presenter on the food lifestyle show Market Trotter with food critic Chua Lam. Here she was convinced by Lam to pursue her dream of opening her own bakery. After graduating from the Paris-based culinary school Le Cordon Bleu in 2010 she apprenticed at French bakery Ladurée and the Caprice at the Four Seasons Hotel in Hong Kong. A year later Strang opened her own pâtisserie petiteAmanda in the IFC serving a range of French pastries and desserts.

Filmography
 2001 — Martial Angels
 2001 — Final Romance
 2002 — Beauty and the Breast
 2007 — Sum seung si sing
 2008 — A Decade of Love

References

External links
 

1980 births
People from Tahiti
French actresses
French female models
French Polynesian people of Taiwanese descent
Hong Kong actresses
Hong Kong female models
21st-century Hong Kong women singers
Living people
21st-century French women singers